The European Convention for the Prevention of Torture and Inhuman or Degrading Treatment or Punishment was adopted by the member states of the Council of Europe, meeting at Strasbourg on 26 November 1987. After the European Convention on Human Rights, the Convention for the Prevention of Torture is widely regarded as being one of the most important of the Council of Europe's treaties. The Convention marks a fresh and preventive approach in handling human rights violations. It was subsequently amended by two Protocols. Additionally, the Committee for the Prevention of Torture was established to comply with the provisions of the convention. This body is enabled to visit any place within the jurisdiction of the states' parties where people are deprived of their liberty in line with the articles of the convention.

As of 2020, the convention has been ratified by all 47 of the Council of Europe's member states. Furthermore, the ratification of the convention has become a pre-condition for all states who have joined the Council of Europe in the last few years.

History

Objective 
At the time of its publishing, the convention was groundbreaking, as it was the first instrument capable of enforcing compliance with the obligations it created. Therefore, the objective was to create a document which would ensure adequate consequences are presented to those who do not abide by it. Despite the existence of core publications such as the United Nations Charter or the Universal Declaration of Human Rights, these documents simply could not stop or remedy violations in a rigorous way. The key was thus to prevent torture altogether.

Background 
The origins of the Conventions date to a proposal by Jean-Jacques Gautier in 1976. Gautier was the founder of the Swiss Committee against Torture. He was inspired by the International Committee of the Red Cross (ICRC), who conducted visits to places where prisoners of war were held. He suggested that the conditions of prisoners were improved. However, the ICRC (at the time) had the power to conduct such visits only in case of international armed conflict between states parties to the Geneva Conventions. Gautier thus proposed to extend this system of visits to include all other places where individuals are deprived of their liberty, such as prisons, police stations, psychiatric institutions and remand centres. This proposal then formed the basis of a draft which would eventually become the International Convention against Torture and other Cruel, Inhuman or Degrading Treatment or Punishment. The draft was submitted in April 1980 to be evaluated by the Commission on Human Rights, the body which would come to draft the UN Convention.

Gautier's ideas were then taken by the Council of Europe to be realised, at least at the regional level. Eventually, in June 1983, a report was produced with a draft European Convention on the Protection of Detainees from Torture and from Cruel, Inhuman or Degrading Treatment or Punishment. The report was accepted by the Consultative Assembly in September 1983. Several years of debate followed, including discussions regarding the views of the European Commission and Court of Human Rights. An agreed draft was finally concluded in June 1986, which was transmitted to the Committee of Ministers, who ultimately adopted it on June 26, 1987. It was opened for signature on November 26, 1987. At the time, the convention was signed by all of the 21 member states of the Council of Europe. As of 2020, it has been signed by all 47 member states of the council. It is also open for accession by non-member States.

Actors 
This section serves as an overview of the actors which actively contributed to creating the convention.

 Jean-Jacques Gautier, the person who came forward with the original proposal which would eventually lead to the adoption of the Convention
 the Council of Europe
 the Member States of the Council of Europe

Convention Articles 
Hereby is a selection of the most significant Articles of the Convention which outline the core values of the document.

Article 1 
The primary and opening article of the Convention depicts the need for the establishment for a European Committee for the Prevention of Torture and Inhuman or Degrading Treatment or Punishment. For the remainder of the document, it is referred to as "the Committee".

"The Committee shall, by means of visits, examine the treatment of persons deprived of their liberty". If deemed necessary, the committee is to strengthen their protection from torture.

Article 2 
Article 2 emphasises that each Member State in accordance with the Convention shall permit visits to a place within its jurisdiction where people are deprived of their liberty. This is under the condition that the liberty is taken by a public authority.

"Each Party shall permit visits, in accordance with this Convention, to any place within its jurisdiction where persons are deprived of their liberty by a public authority"

Article 8 
Article 8 states that if in need of a particular visit, the committee is to notify the Government of the Member State concerned. Only after that can it visit any place as referred to in Article 2.

"The following facilities must be provided to the Committee to carry out the task:"

 "access to its territory and the right to travel without restriction"
 "full information regarding where those deprived of liberty are being held"
 "unlimited access to any place where persons are deprived of their liberty"
 "this includes the right to move inside such places without restriction"
 "any other relevant information deemed necessary for the Committee to carry out its task"
 "noting that when seeking this information, the Committee must abide by national laws and professional ethics"
 "the Committee may interview those deprived of liberty in private"
 "the Committee may communicate freely with any person whom it believed to   supply relevant information"
 "If necessary, the Committee may immediately communicate observations to the competent authorities of the Party concerned"

Article 10 
"Each visit should be accompanied by a drawn up report by the Committee regarding the facts found during the visit".

 "This should account for any observations which may have been submitted by the Party concerned. Any recommendations are to be transmitted to the Party. If necessary, the Committee is to suggest improvements in the protection of persons deprived of their liberty"

"If the Party refuses to co-operate or improve the conditions of those deprived of their liberty, the Committee may decide to make a public statement on the matter".

Article 11 
"The information gathered by the Committee regarding its visits, report and consultations is to remain confidential."

Only at the request of the Party concerned is the Committee allowed to publish the report.

No personal data can be published without the consent of the person concerned.

Article 18 
The convention is open for signature by all member states of the Council of Europe. It is subject to ratification, acceptance or approval. Instruments of any of these actions are to be deposited with the Secretary General of the Council of Europe.

Non-members states of the Council of Europe may be invited to accede to the convention by the Committee of Ministers of the Council of Europe.

Convention Protocols

Protocol No. 1 (ETS No. 151) 
The first Protocol was adopted November 4, 1993. The Protocol "opens" the convention by providing that the Committee of Ministers of the Council of Europe may invite any non-member State to accede to it. It is now an inherent characteristic to the convention, despite the fact that only member States are signatories as of May 2020.

Protocol No. 2 (ETS No. 152) 
Protocol No. 2 was adopted November 4, 1993 and introduced amendments of a technical nature. The committee is now provisioned to be placed in "one of two groups for election purposes". This is to ensure that at least one half of the committee's members is renewed every two years. The Protocol also allows members of the committee to be re-elected twice, instead of only once.

Member states participants

Albania 

 Convention signed October 2, 1996
 Convention ratified October 2, 1996
 Convention entered into force February 1, 1997

Andorra 

 Convention signed September 10, 1996
 Convention ratified January 1, 1997
 Convention entered into force January 5, 1997

Armenia 

 Convention signed May 11, 2001
 Convention ratified June 18, 2002
 Convention entered into force October 10, 2002

Austria 

 Convention signed November 26, 1987
 Convention ratified January 6, 1989
 Convention entered into force May 1, 1989

Azerbaijan 

 Convention signed December 21, 2001
 Convention ratified April 15, 2002
 Convention entered into force August 1, 2002
 However, Azerbaijan declares that it is "unable to guarantee the application of the provisions of the Convention" in territories occupied by the Republic of Armenia until those territories are liberated from that occupation

Belgium 

 Convention signed November 26, 1987
 Convention ratified July 23, 1991
 Convention entered into force November 1, 1991

Bosnia and Herzegovina 

 Convention signed July 12, 2002
 Convention ratified July 12, 2002
 Convention entered into force November 1, 2002

Bulgaria 

 Convention signed September 30, 1993
 Convention ratified May 3, 1994
 Convention entered into force September 1, 1994

Croatia 

 Convention signed November 6, 1996
 Convention ratified October 11, 1997
 Convention entered into force February 1, 1998

Cyprus 

 Convention signed November 26, 1987
 Convention ratified April 3, 1989
 Convention entered into force August 1, 1989

Czech Republic 

 Convention signed December 23, 1992
 Convention ratified September 7, 1995
 Convention entered into force January 1, 1996

Denmark 

 Convention signed November 26, 1987
 Convention ratified May 2, 1989
 Convention entered into force September 1, 1989

Estonia 

 Convention signed June 28, 1996
 Convention ratified November 6, 1996
 Convention entered into force March 1, 1997

Finland 

 Convention signed November 16, 1989
 Convention ratified December 20, 1990
 Convention entered into force April 1, 1991

France 

 Convention signed November 26, 1987
 Convention ratified January 9, 1989
 Convention entered into force May 1, 1989

Georgia 

 Convention signed February 16, 2000
 Convention ratified June 20, 2000
 Convention entered into force October 1, 2000
 However, Georgia states it will "not be responsible for violations of the provisions of the Convention and the safety of the members of the Committee"
 This applies solely to the territories of Abkhazia and the Tskhinval region, until the territorial integrity of Georgia is fully restored and control over these territories is carried out by "legitimate authorities"

Germany 

 Convention signed November 26, 1987
 Convention ratified February 21, 1990
 Convention entered into force June 1, 1990

Greece 

 Convention signed November 26, 1987
 Convention ratified August 2, 1991
 Convention entered into force December 1, 1991

Hungary 

 Convention signed February 9, 1993
 Convention ratified November 4, 1993
 Convention entered into force March 1, 1994

Iceland 

 Convention signed November 26, 1987
 Convention ratified June 19, 1990
 Convention entered into force October 1, 1990

Ireland 

 Convention signed March 14, 1988
 Convention ratified March 14, 1999
 Convention entered into force February 1, 1989

Italy 

 Convention signed November 26, 1987
 Convention ratified December 29, 1988
 Convention entered into force April 1, 1989
 Italy declares that paragraph 2(a) of the Annex on Privileges and Immunities is not to be interpreted as "excluding any police or customs check of the luggage of the members of the Committee"
 This is assuming that the check is carried out whilst complying with the rules on confidentiality as established in Article 11 of the Convention

Latvia 

 Convention signed September 11, 1997
 Convention ratified February 10, 1998
 Convention entered into force June 1, 1998

Liechtenstein 

 Convention signed November 26, 1987
 Convention ratified September 12, 1991
 Convention entered into force January 1, 1992

Lithuania 

 Convention signed September 14, 1995
 Convention ratified November 26, 1998
 Convention entered into force March 1, 1999

Luxembourg 

 Convention signed November 26, 1987
 Convention ratified September 6, 1988
 Convention entered into force February, 1989

Malta 

 Convention signed November 26, 1987
 Convention ratified March 7, 1998
 Convention entered into force February 1, 1989

Republic of Moldova 

 Convention signed May 5, 1996
 Convention ratified October 2, 1997
 Convention entered into force February 1, 1998

Monaco 

 Convention signed November 30, 2005
 Convention ratified November 30, 2005
 Convention entered into force March 1, 2006

Montenegro 

 Convention signed March 3, 2004
 Convention ratified March 3, 2004
 Convention entered into force June 6, 2006

Netherlands 

 Convention signed November 26, 1987
 Convention ratified October 12, 1988
 Convention entered into force February 1, 1989
 The Kingdom of the Netherlands accepts said Convention, including with "Annex for the Kingdom in Europe, the Netherlands Antilles and Aruba"

North Macedonia 

 Convention signed June 14, 1996
 Convention ratified June 6, 1997
 Convention entered into force October 1, 1997

Norway 

 Convention signed November 26, 1987
 Convention ratified April 21, 1989
 Convention entered into force August 1, 1989

Poland 

 Convention signed July 11, 1994
 Convention ratified October 10, 1994
 Convention entered into force February 1, 1995

Portugal 

 Convention signed November 26, 1987
 Convention ratified March 29, 1990
 Convention entered into force July 1, 1990

Romania 

 Convention signed November 4, 1993
 Convention ratified October 4, 1994
 Convention entered into force February 1, 1995

Russian Federation 

 Convention signed February 28, 1996
 Convention ratified May 5, 1998
 Convention entered into force September 1, 1998

San Marino 

 Convention signed November 16, 1989
 Convention ratified January 31, 1990
 Convention entered into force May 1, 1990

Serbia 

 Convention signed March 3, 2004
 Convention ratified March 3, 2004
 Convention entered into force July 1, 2004

Slovak Republic 

 Convention signed December 23, 1992
 Convention ratified May 11, 1994
 Convention entered into force September 1, 1994

Slovenia 

 Convention signed November 4, 1993
 Convention ratified February 2, 1994
 Convention entered into force June 1, 1994

Spain 

 Convention signed November 26, 1987
 Convention ratified May 2, 1989
 Convention entered into force September 1, 1989

Sweden 

 Convention signed November 26, 1987
 Convention ratified June 21, 1988
 Convention entered into force February 1, 1989

Switzerland 

 Convention signed November 26, 1987
 Convention ratified October 7, 1988
 Convention entered into force February 1, 1989

Turkey 

 Convention signed January 11, 1988
 Convention ratified February 26, 1988
 Convention entered into force February 1, 1989

Ukraine 

 Convention signed May 2, 1996
 Convention ratified May 5, 1997
 Convention entered into force September 1, 1997

United Kingdom 

 Convention signed November 26, 1987
 Convention ratified June 24, 1988
 Convention is ratified in respect of the United Kingdom of Great Britain and Northern Ireland, the Bailiwick of Jersey and the Isle of Man
 Convention entered into force February 1, 1989
 October 30, 2013, the convention was extended to the Sovereign Base Areas of Akrotiri and Dhekelia in Cyprus, which are territories for which the United Kingdom is responsible in regards to international relations

Non-member states participants 
Currently, the list of signatories includes only the member states of the Council of Europe. It is open for signature to non-member states, however none have done so as of the year 2020.

See also
 European Social Charter
 United Nations Optional Protocol to the Convention against Torture and other Cruel, Inhuman or Degrading Treatment or Punishment
Article 3 of the European Convention on Human Rights
List of Council of Europe treaties

Further reading
European Convention for the Prevention of Torture and Inhuman or Degrading Treatment or Punishment

References

Council of Europe treaties
Anti-torture treaties
Human rights instruments
Treaties concluded in 1987
Treaties of Albania
Treaties of Andorra
Treaties of Armenia
Treaties of Austria
Treaties of Azerbaijan
Treaties of Belgium
Treaties of Bosnia and Herzegovina
Treaties of Bulgaria
Treaties of Croatia
Treaties of Cyprus
Treaties of the Czech Republic
Treaties of Denmark
Treaties of Estonia
Treaties of Finland
Treaties of France
Treaties of Georgia (country)
Treaties of West Germany
Treaties of Greece
Treaties of Hungary
Treaties of Iceland
Treaties of Ireland
Treaties of Italy
Treaties of Latvia
Treaties of Liechtenstein
Treaties of Lithuania
Treaties of Luxembourg
Treaties of Malta
Treaties of Moldova
Treaties of Monaco
Treaties of Montenegro
Treaties of the Netherlands
Treaties of Norway
Treaties of Poland
Treaties of Portugal
Treaties of Romania
Treaties of Russia
Treaties of San Marino
Treaties of Serbia and Montenegro
Treaties of Slovakia
Treaties of Slovenia
Treaties of Spain
Treaties of Sweden
Treaties of Switzerland
Treaties of North Macedonia
Treaties of Turkey
Treaties of Ukraine
Treaties of the United Kingdom
1987 in France
Treaties extended to the Faroe Islands
Treaties extended to Greenland
Treaties extended to Aruba
Treaties extended to the Netherlands Antilles
Treaties extended to Jersey
Treaties extended to the Isle of Man
Treaties extended to Gibraltar
Treaties extended to Guernsey